Bagh-e Now may refer to:

Bagh-e Now, Fars
Bagh-e Now, Qom
Bagh-e Now, Razavi Khorasan
Bagh-e Now, Yazd